Stanley Weyman may refer to:

Stanley J. Weyman (1855–1928), English novelist
Stanley Clifford Weyman (1890–1960), American multiple impostor